Bähre is a surname. Notable people with the surname include:

Harry Bähre (born 1941), German footballer
Karl Bähre (1899–1960), German water polo player 
Mike-Steven Bähre (born 1995), German footballer

See also
Bähr